Al Jaffe was ESPN's vice-president of talent (official title: Vice-president of Talent Negotiation and Production Recruitment), from 1996 until his retirement in January 2015. He joined ESPN in 1987. He was also one of the judges on all three seasons of the network's reality series Dream Job.

A native of Pittsfield, Massachusetts and a 1968 graduate of Emerson College, where he majored in Mass Communications, Jaffe previously served as a news producer at WHDH-TV and WCVB-TV in Boston, and as News Director at KNTV-TV San Jose, California, and KOVR-TV in Sacramento.

Awards
He was elected to the Emerson College Board of Trustees in 2007 and was inducted into the WERS (Emerson College Radio Station) Hall of Fame in 2011.

Family
His daughter Pam Jaffe also attended Emerson College and graduated in May 2007.  She is currently a Supervising Producer on the WE-TV reality show Braxton Family Values.

Awards and honors
1978 – Emmy Award, Boston chapter of National Academy of Television Arts and Sciences, Best Newscast (WCVB-TV)
1986 – Radio Television News Directors Association Award, Regional Investigative Reporting (KOVR)

External links
Al Jaffe bio at ESPN's Dream Job Season 3 website

Year of birth missing (living people)
Living people
Emerson College alumni
People from Pittsfield, Massachusetts